HNLMS Amsterdam was the last replenishment oiler serving with the Royal Netherlands Navy. Amsterdam entered service on 2 September 1995 and replaced . On 4 December 2014 it was decommissioned and sold to the Peruvian Navy where it was renamed BAP Tacna.

Design and description
Amsterdam is a replenishment oiler that was designed to replace the ageing . The result of a joint effort between the Nevesbu and E.N. Bazàn (later IZAR, then Navantia) design bureaus, the vessel was one of three ordered; two by the Netherlands and one by Spain to a modified design. The Netherlands's planned second vessel was cancelled. The ship has a displacement of  fully loaded. Amsterdam was constructed to merchant ship standards with military nuclear, biological and chemical damage control.

Amsterdam is propelled by a single five-bladed -diameter LIPS controllable pitch propeller powered by two IZAR/Burmeister & Wain V16V 40/45 diesel engines creating . Amsterdam is equipped with four  IZAR/Burmeister & Wain generators for power generation. The ship has a complement of 23 officers and 137 enlisted with an additional 70 spare berths. The aviation complement of 24 is included in the overall number. The vessel was designed with up to 20% of its crew be female.

The ship was initially armed with two Oerlikon  cannon and one Signaal Goalkeeper  close-in weapon system (CIWS). The 20 mm cannon were later removed and replaced two single-mounted  Browning M2 machine guns. Amsterdam also mounts four Mark 36 SRBOC chaff decoy launchers and a Nixie towed torpedo decoy system. The replenishment oiler mounts Ferranti AWARE-4 ESM radar warning and two Kelvin Hughes surface search and helicopter control radars. The ship was capable of operating three Westland Lynx or two AgustaWestland AW101/Westland Sea King/NHIndustries NH90 helicopters from its flight deck in Dutch service.

The ship also contained repair shops to aid the fleet. Amsterdam has four 2-ton dual-purpose and two 250-kilogram solid stores alongside replenishment stations on each side of the ship and a vertical replenishment station forward.

Service history

Dutch service

The ship was ordered in October 1991 as a replacement for the ageing HNLMS Poolster. The hull was constructed by B.Y. Merwede in Hardinxveld, the Netherlands, with the keel being laid down on 25 May 1992 and launched on 11 September 1993. The hull was taken to the Royal Schelde shipyard in Vlissingen to be completed and began sea trials on 3 April 1995. The vessel was accepted by the Royal Netherlands Navy on 10 July 1995 and Amsterdam was commissioned on 2 September 1995.

In early 1996, the ship sailed to the Arctic for tests on operations in cold climates, later in the year operating of the Iberian peninsula with other Dutch warships. In 1997, the ship sailed to Singapore and Abu Dhabi for defence expositions. In 1998, Amsterdam was one of the Dutch warships that participated in one of the largest NATO military exercises to that date off Spain. In 2000, the ship sailed with a Dutch squadron, visiting several Asian countries. In August, the ship performed its 1,000 replenishment at sea.

In November 2001, Amsterdam was assigned to NATO's Standing Naval Force Atlantic (STANAVFORLANT). In December, Amsterdam and the frigate  transferred to the Mediterranean Sea as part of Standing Naval Force Mediterranean to take part in NATO's Operation Active Endeavour, patrolling the eastern Mediterranean. On 2 January 2002, the ship recovered 20 refugees from Mediterranean waters after being taken off their ship in heavy weather. The vessel returned to the Netherlands in late January. From April to June, Amsterdam was in the Mediterranean again as part of Active Endeavour. In 2003, the replenishment oiler took part in the military exercise Northern Light off the coast of Scotland and joined STANAVFORLANT for naval exercises in 2004. This was followed by a deployment to Curacao in the Caribbean Sea to take over station duties until 2005, when the ship returned to European waters.
 
Amsterdam deployed to the Middle East as part of Operation Enduring Freedom during 2005/2006 and provided assistance to two US naval vessels after a battle they had fought with pirates on 18 March 2006. In 2008, the vessel was part of a UNIFIL mission to Lebanon. The vessel then returned to Caribbean waters, operating with British, French, Canadian and American forces in the region. From September 2010 to January 2011, Amsterdam was assigned to Operation Atalanta and Operation Shield off the coast of Somalia. The ship was assigned in December 2010 to the coast of Côte d'Ivoire in order to assist in a possible evacuation of European Union citizens from the country in the wake of unrest after the 2010 presidential election.

In 2012–2013, Amsterdam was assigned to the Dutch Caribbean force, intercepting drug smugglers, before returning to the Mediterranean in mid-2014. The ship was sold to Peru in July 2014. Amsterdam was decommissioned on 4 December 2014 and transferred to the Peruvian Navy.

Peruvian service
Amsterdam was acquired by the Peruvian Navy in July 2014. It was delivered to the navy on 4 December 2014 and commissioned as Tacna, for the border city Tacna, with the number ARL 158. The vessel was part of the revamp of the navy.

Notes

Citations

Bibliography

External links

 Hr.Ms. Amsterdam, Royal Netherlands Navy website

Auxiliary ships of the Royal Netherlands Navy
1992 ships
Auxiliary replenishment ship classes
Ships built in Vlissingen